The Fivel was a historical river in the province of Groningen in the Netherlands. The Fivel debouched into a wide estuary of the Wadden Sea.

Background
The banks of this former estuary are still recognizable by rows of villages on artificial dwelling hills (wierden):
on the east side Garrelsweer, Loppersum, Eenum, and Godlinze;
on the west side Stedum, Middelstum, Kantens, Rottum, and Usquert.

This was Fivelgo, one of the missionary districts assigned to Ludger after Charlemagne had acquired Frisia east of the Lauwers in 785.

In or shortly before the 11th century the Delf was dug, as an east-west waterway for navigation, and also for the drainage of the hinterland when the estuary was silting up. During the Middle Ages, the estuary was increasingly diked until totally reclaimed; the streambed of the Fivel is hardly visible any longer.

See also

References

Rivers of Groningen (province)
Rivers of the Netherlands